The Gate of Elvira (Spanish: Puerta de Elvira) is an arch located in Granada, Spain. It was declared Bien de Interés Cultural in 1896. It is located at the beginning of Calle Elvira (Elvira Street), on the edge of the Albaicín neighbourhood.

The gate was formerly known as Bāb Ilbīra in Arabic. It was originally part of the 11th-century Zirid walls, but in the 14th century it was rebuilt into a heavily-fortified structure in order to be incorporated into the new Nasrid extension of the walls. Only a part of the gate remains today. A large Muslim cemetery, known as the Ibn Malik Cemetery, formerly existed outside this gate. The present-day Royal Hospital (Hospital Real) stands over a part of this former cemetery.

References

See also 
List of Bien de Interés Cultural in the Province of Granada

Bien de Interés Cultural landmarks in the Province of Granada
Granada
City gates in Spain

Nasrid architecture